Snedeker Glacier is a channel glacier flowing to the Antarctic coast 9 nautical miles (17 km) west of Merritt Island. Mapped (1955) by G.D. Blodgett from air photos taken by U.S. Navy Operation Highjump (1946–47). Named by Advisory Committee on Antarctic Names (US-ACAN) for Robert H. Snedeker, photo interpreter with U.S. Navy Operation Windmill (1947–48), who assisted in establishing astronomical control stations along the coast from Wilhelm II Coast to Budd Coast.

See also
 List of glaciers in the Antarctic
 Glaciology

References
 

Glaciers of Wilkes Land